Tierkreis is the German word for the Zodiac. It may also refer to:

Suikoden Tierkreis, a Nintendo DS video game
Tierkreis (Stockhausen), a German musical composition